Arbi Sanit (4 June 1939 – 25 March 2021) was an Indonesian political scientist and lecturer in the Faculty of Social and Political Sciences, University of Indonesia. He wrote several books on Indonesian political system.

Early life
Sanit was born in Painan, West Sumatra. He obtained his bachelor's degree in political sciences from the Faculty of Social and Political Sciences, University of Indonesia, in 1969. He also studied at the University of Wisconsin in 1973-1974.

References

1939 births
Minangkabau people
2021 deaths
People from Pesisir Selatan Regency
Indonesian political scientists
University of Wisconsin–Madison alumni
Academic staff of the University of Indonesia